There are many beaches on the Indian coast which stretches for 7517 km both on the eastern and western coast. This is a list of the notable beaches in India sorted by states anti-clockwise.

Blue Flag beaches

As of October 2022, India has following 12 Blue Flag beaches. The Ble Flag beach is a eco-label awarded to the beaches on the criteria of cleanliness, safety and security of users, amenities and eco-friendliness, etc. Counter-clockwise list:

 Odisha

 Puri Beach or Puri beach in Puri.

 Andhra Pradesh

 Rushikonda Beach in Visakhapatnam.

 Tamil Nadu

 Kovalam beach, 40 km south of Chennai.

 Puducherry

 Eden beach in Puducherry.

 Andaman and Nicobar

 Radhanagar beach or Beach No 7 in Havelock Islands.

 Lakshadweep

 Minicoy Thundi beach in Minicoy.

 Kadmat beach in Kadmat island.

 Kerala
 Kappad beach on north fringe of Kozhikode.

 Karnataka
 Kasarkod beach in Kasarkod village in Uttara Kannada district.

 Padubidri Beach in Udupi district.

 Diu and Daman

 Ghoghla beach in Diu.

 Gujarat
 Shivrajpur beach in Dwarka, at Shivrajpur village 12 km from Dwarka on Dwarka-Okha Highway.

West coast

Gujarat

The beaches along the western state of Gujarat are:

Maharashtra
The state of Maharashtra has:

Goa

The beaches in the state of Goa are listed below:

Agonda Beach
Arambol Beach
Benaulim Beach
Cavelossim Beach
Chapora Beach
Mandrem Beach
Palolem Beach
Varca Beach
Baga Beach
Candolim Beach
Calangute Beach
Colva Beach
Miramar Beach, Goa
Morjim Beach
Bambolim Beach
Cabo de rama Beach
Anjuna Beach
Utorda Beach
Majorda Beach	
Betalbatim Beach	
Sernabatim Beach	
Cavelossim Beach	
Mobor Beach	
Betul Beach
Querim Beach	
Kalacha Beach	
Mandrem Beach	
Ashvem Beach	
Vagator Beach
Ozran Beach	
Sinquerim Beach
Coco Beach
Kegdole Beach
Caranzalem Beach	
Dona Paula Beach	
Vaiguinim Beach	
Siridao Beach
Bogmalo Beach	
Baina Beach	
Hansa Beach	
Hollant Beach	
Cansaulim Beach	
Velsao Beach	
Canaiguinim Beach	
Kakolem Beach	
Dharvalem Beach	
Cola Beach	
Agonda Beach	
Palolem Beach	
Patnem Beach	
Rajbag Beach	
Talpona Beach	
Galgibag Beach	
Polem Beach
Pebble Beach Goa

Karnataka

Kerala

Chavakkad Beach
Cherai Beach
Fort Kochi beach
Kollam Beach
Kanhangad Beach
Marari beach
Meenkunnu Beach
Muzhappilangad Beach
Payyambalam Beach
Saddam Beach
Shangumughom Beach
Snehatheeram Beach
Kappil Beach Varkala
Thirumullavaram Beach
Kovalam Beach
Hawa Beach, Kovalam
Samudra Beach, Kovalam
Lighthouse Beach, Kovalam
Kannur Beach
Kappad Beach
Varkala Beach / Papanasham Beach
Bekal Beach
Alleppey beach
Thiruvambadi Beach
Kappil Beach

East coast

The Indian East Coast starts with West Bengal and extends further through Odisha, Andhra Pradesh and finally ends in Tamil Nadu.

West Bengal
Beaches in West Bengal are:

Henry Island Beach
Bakkhali sea beach
Frasergunj Sea Beach
Gangasagar Sea Beach
Junput beach
Bankiput Sea Beach
Mandarmani beach
Shankarpur Beach
Tajpur beach
Digha Sea Beach
Udaypur Sea Beach

Odisha
The beaches in Odisha are:

Talsari Beach
Dagara beach
Chandipur-on-sea
Gahirmatha Beach
Satabhaya beach
Pentha Sea Beach
Hukitola beach
Paradeep sea beach
Astaranga beach
Beleswar beach
Konark Beach
Chandrabhaga beach
Ramachandi beach
Puri Beach
Satpada beach
Parikud beach
Ganjam beach
Aryapalli beach
Gopalpur-on-Sea
Dhabaleshwar beach
Ramayapatnam Beach
Sonapur beach

Andhra Pradesh

The following are the beaches in Andhra Pradesh, India.

Tamil Nadu

The beaches in the southern state of Tamil Nadu are:

Pondicherry
 Promenade Beach
 Karaikal Beach
 Yanam Beach
 Auroville Beach
 Paradise Beach
 Serenity Beach

Island Territories
 Radhanagar Beach, Andaman and Nicobar Islands
 Bangaram beach, Lakshadweep Islands
 Kala Patthar Beach, Andaman and Nicobar Islands
 Elephant Beach, Andaman and Nicobar Islands
 Wandoor Beach, Andaman and Nicobar Islands

See also
 Coastal India
 Coral reefs in India
 List of beaches
 Tourism in India

References

Beaches